(), abbreviated from , is a term used in South Korea to refer to men in their 20s with negative tendencies toward feminism. The term first emerged in the late 2010s.

Views 
 have a negative tendency toward feminism. They have been compared to "Angry Young Men" in Susan Faludi's 1991 book Backlash. Idaenams are strongly opposed to misandry ( or ).

In 2021, a survey by National Human Rights Commission of Korea found that 70 percent of men in their twenties opposed affirmative action for women. Many  believe that the gender quotas are discriminatory.

Anti-feminism in South Korea is more pronounced among high-income young men. In addition, according to statistics from 2021, men in their twenties and thirties ("Idaenam") are less receptive to LGBT rights than men in their 40s and 50s ("386 Generation male"), but more than men above the age of sixty.

in South Korean politics 
The  phenomenon is a form of social backlash similar to the Western "angry white man", but this often leads to political conservatism or populism (Including both left and right sides).

South Korea's liberal Moon Jae-in government implemented a more feminist policy than the previous conservative government, and men in their 20s had severe antipathy against it. In particular, South Korean right-wingers and social conservatives are trying to make  their main supporters by actively attacking feminism.

See also 
 Reverse discrimination
 Backlash (sociology)
 Identity politics
 Incel
 Manosphere
 Gangnam leftist
 Feminism in South Korea
 Angry young man (disambiguation)

References

External links 
 Last Look: South Korea's surprising anti-feminist movement (CNN)

Cultural generations
Conservatism in South Korea
Criticism of feminism
Identity politics in Korea
Men in South Korea
Misandry
Opposition to feminism in South Korea
Opposition to affirmative action
Political terminology in South Korea
Populism in South Korea
Right-wing populism in South Korea